Floral Park is a subbarrio, a legal subdivision of Hato Rey Central, a barrio in San Juan, Puerto Rico. 

It was formerly one of 12 sectors in Hato Rey before it was subdivided into Hato Rey Norte, Hato Rey Central and Hato Rey Sur.

In the 1950s, this area was known for its horse racing with 3 tracks (Las Casas, Las Monjas and Quintana), nearby.

References

External links

Hato Rey, Puerto Rico
Municipality of San Juan